USS Doloma (SP-1062) was a United States Navy patrol vessel in commission from 1917 until 1918 or 1919.

Doloma was built as a private motorboat of the same name in 1907. In 1917, the U.S. Navy acquired her either under a free lease or a USD $1.00-per-month lease from her owner, A. Hompe of Grand Rapids, Michigan, for use as a section patrol boat during World War I. She was commissioned on either 28 May or 26 July 1917 as USS Doloma (SP-1062).

Assigned to the 9th Naval District, Doloma served on patrol duties on the Great Lakes for the rest of World War I, although her service was limited.

Doloma was returned to Hompe after the war. Her return date is unclear; sources claim both that the Commandant, 9th Naval District, reported on 31 December 1918 that she had been returned to Hompe and that she was returned to him on 4 March 1919.

References

Patrol vessels of the United States Navy
World War I patrol vessels of the United States
1907 ships
Great Lakes ships